The 2017 Almaty Challenger was a professional tennis tournament played on clay courts. It was the first edition of the tournament which was part of the 2017 ATP Challenger Tour. It took place in Almaty, Kazakhstan between 2 October and 7 October 2017.

Singles main-draw entrants

Seeds

 1 Rankings are as of September 25, 2017.

Other entrants
The following players received wildcards into the singles main draw:
  Timur Khabibulin
  Roman Khassanov
  Alex Molčan
  Denis Yevseyev

The following players received entry from the qualifying draw:
  Vladimir Ivanov
  Evgeny Karlovskiy
  Alexandar Lazov
  Denys Molchanov

Champions

Singles

 Filip Krajinović def.  Laslo Đere 6–0, 6–3.

Doubles

 Timur Khabibulin /  Aleksandr Nedovyesov def.  Ivan Gakhov /  Nino Serdarušić 1–6, 6–3, [10–3].

References

2017 ATP Challenger Tour